Silke Gast (born 30 April 1972) is a retired female javelin thrower from Germany.

She finished fourth at the 1994 European Championships. Her only medal at the German championships came in 1994 when she won the bronze behind Karen Forkel and Tanja Damaske.

Achievements

References

1972 births
Living people
German female javelin throwers